"Smoke" is a song by Australian rock band Eskimo Joe. It was released in June 2004 as the second single from their second studio album, A Song Is a City. 

It reached number 62 on Triple J's Hottest 100 for 2004.

Track listing

Release history

References 

Eskimo Joe songs
2004 singles
2004 songs
Mushroom Records singles
Warner Music Australasia singles
Songs written by Stuart MacLeod (musician)
Songs written by Joel Quartermain
Songs written by Kavyen Temperley